The Liga Premier Masculina de Fútsal de Costa Rica, is the top league for Futsal in Costa Rica. The winning team obtains the participation right to the CONCACAF Futsal Club Championship.

Champions 
 2009: Borussia Fútsal
 2010: T-shirt Mundo Fútsal
 2011: Barrio Peralta Fútsal
 2012: Orotina Fútsal
 2013: Borussia Fútsal
 2014: Borussia Fútsal
 2015: Borussia Fútsal
 2016: Grupo Line
 2017: Borussia Fútsal.
 2018: Joma Extremos.

See also 

 CONCACAF Futsal Club Championship
 Costa Rican Football Federation
 Costa Rica national futsal team
 Costa Rica Futsal Cup

References

Futsal in Costa Rica